Henry Bert Vorhees (September 30, 1874 – February 8, 1910)  was a professional baseball player. Nicknamed "Cy" after Cy Young, Vorhees made his major league debut in April 1902 with the Philadelphia Phillies.

He then jumped to the Washington Senators and pitched one game for them. He was one of a long line of players who jumped from the National League to the American League before the 1903 peace agreement.

External links
 Baseball Reference
 Findagrave entry

1874 births
1910 deaths
Major League Baseball pitchers
Philadelphia Phillies players
Washington Senators (1901–1960) players
Syracuse Stars (minor league baseball) players
Montreal Royals players
Rome Romans players
Wilkes-Barre Coal Barons players
Reading Coal Heavers players
Columbus Senators players
Oberlin Yeomen baseball players
Syracuse Orangemen baseball players
Baseball players from Ohio